Alfie Martin Kevin Pavey (born 2 October 1995) is an English footballer who plays as a forward for National League South club Braintree Town.

Career
On 18 December 2012, he was called up for the first time by Maidstone United, remaining an unused substitute in their 1–2 defeat away to FC Halifax Town in the FA Trophy second round at The Shay.

In Maidstone's youth ranks, Pavey scored over 300 goals in three years, including 124 in his final season before on 22 May 2013 joining Millwall on a two-year academy scholarship. He was included in the squad for one match in that Championship campaign, called up by interim manager Neil Harris for their 1–3 home defeat to Leicester City at The New Den on 1 January 2014.

On 26 September 2014, Pavey joined Conference leaders Barnet on a month-long loan, saying "It should be a great experience for me playing against bigger, stronger players and working on my hold-up play". The following day, he made his senior debut in their 2–1 win over Forest Green Rovers at The New Lawn, replacing Sam Hoskins for the final eleven minutes and earning a yellow card for a foul on David Pipe. He made two further appearances for Barnet, both again as a substitute.

Millwall ended the 2014–15 Championship season with relegation to League One. Pavey was included in their squad for the final game of the season, away to Wolverhampton Wanderers at the Molineux Stadium. He made his professional debut in the 2–4 defeat, coming on in the final minute for fellow debutant Jamie Philpot, who himself had come on as a substitute ten minutes earlier and scored.

On 8 January 2016, Pavey returned to the National League, joining Aldershot Town on a 28-day loan. The following day, he made his first career start and scored his first senior goal in a 3–1 home win over Chester. After two goals in 12 games, including seven starts, his loan was extended for the remainder of the season.

On 16 August, Pavey returned to the National League, this time on a three-month loan with Bromley. He made his debut on the same day, in a 2–2 draw with former club Aldershot Town.

On 9 March 2017, Pavey joined National League South side Dartford on a youth loan for a 28-day period. He scored his first goal for the club in his second match on 21 March 2017 in a 4–0 victory over Margate. During his time on loan he made eight league appearances - scoring two goals - and one play-off semi-final appearance.

At the end of the 2016/17 season, Pavey was released by Millwall. On 15 June 2017 he joined Welling United.

He played two games for Welling United - without scoring - before returning to Dartford on 14 August 2017.

On 29 April 2018, Pavey was awarded the National League South Player of the Season award.

On 25 November 2018, Pavey signed for Dover Athletic. After 11 goals in 37 games, Pavey joined Barnet.

On 17 November 2020, Pavey rejoined Dartford on an initial two-month loan. On 2 January 2021, Pavey was recalled early from his loan by Barnet. He left the Bees at the end of the 2020-21 season.

Pavey re-joined Maidstone for the 2021-22 season. On 26 November 2021, Pavey returned to Dover Athletic on loan for a month. On 27 December, this loan was extended until the end of January 2022. Having scored four goals in ten appearances, including the winner over Eastleigh for Dover's first victory of the season, Pavey had his loan extended by another month on 31 January and then again for another month on 1 March. Pavey was recalled on 28 March after scoring six goals in his second spell at the club. On 11 June 2022, Pavey rejoined Dover Athletic on a permanent basis following his release from Maidstone. He was transfer listed in January 2023, joining Braintree Town on 2 February.

Career statistics

Honours 
Maidstone United
 National League South: 2021–22

References

External links

Living people
1995 births
Footballers from Southwark
Association football forwards
English footballers
Maidstone United F.C. players
Millwall F.C. players
Barnet F.C. players
Aldershot Town F.C. players
Bromley F.C. players
Hampton & Richmond Borough F.C. players
Welling United F.C. players
Dartford F.C. players
Havant & Waterlooville F.C. players
Dover Athletic F.C. players
Braintree Town F.C. players
National League (English football) players
English Football League players